Haapalainen is a Finnish surname. Notable people with the surname include:

 Eero Haapalainen (1880–1937), Finnish Communist leader
 Hannu Haapalainen (1951–2011), Finnish ice hockey player
 Jari Haapalainen (born 1971), Swedish musician, songwriter, and producer
 Väinö Haapalainen (1893–1945), Finnish viola player, composer of the Lemminkäinen Overture (1925) and other works, and prominent teacher of music in Viipuri from 1922 until 1940 when the town was lost to the Soviet Union

Finnish-language surnames